Qur Polcheh (also Romanized as Qūr Polcheh; also known as Qūr Polījeh, Qūrīljeh, and Qūr Poljeh) is a village in Soltanali Rural District, in the Central District of Gonbad-e Qabus County, Golestan Province, Iran. At the 2006 census, its population was 2,283, in 409 families.

References 

Populated places in Gonbad-e Kavus County